Henry Bellows Chase (June 13, 1870 – August 21, 1961) was an American politician and businessperson who served as mayor of Huntsville, Alabama, USA, from 1918 to 1920. A civic leader and a businessman, Chase founded the Alabama Nursery in Huntsville then reorganized it as the Chase Nursery Company in rural Madison County, as part of a community that would become known as Chase, Alabama.

Chase married Annie Stewart. Sources conflict as to whether this marriage took place in August 1896 in Catawba, North Carolina, or in 1900 in Hickory, North Carolina.

References

1870 births
1961 deaths
Mayors of Huntsville, Alabama
People from Livermore, Maine